Gadani Beach is a beach on the Arabian Sea located near the Hub River and Cape Monze in Gadani, Hub District, Balochistan, Pakistan.

 
Gadani Beach is the location of Gadani ship-breaking yard, which is one of the world's largest ship-breaking yards.

Gallery

References

External links
 Ships to be broken at Gadani, 2000

Lasbela District
Landforms of the Indian Ocean
Landforms of the Arabian Sea